Quezon, officially the Province of Quezon, is a province in the Philippines located in the Calabarzon region on Luzon. Kalilayan was the first known name of the province. It was later renamed Tayabas. In honor of the former governor of the province who later
became the second president of the Philippines and the first to be freely elected, Manuel L. Quezon, the province’s name was then changed to Quezon. Lucena, the provincial capital, seat of the provincial government, and the most populous city of the province, is governed independently from the province as a highly urbanized city. To distinguish the province from Quezon City, it is sometimes called Quezon Province.

Quezon is southeast of Metro Manila and is bordered by the provinces of Aurora to the north, Bulacan, Rizal, Laguna and Batangas to the west and the provinces of Camarines Norte and Camarines Sur to the east. Part of Quezon lies on an isthmus connecting the Bicol Peninsula to the main part of Luzon. The province also includes the Polillo Islands in the Philippine Sea. Some marine parts of the Verde Island Passage, the center of the center of world's marine biodiversity, are also in the province.

A major tourism draw to the province is Mount Banahaw. The mountain is surrounded by spiritual mysticism with many Anitist adherents, Christian cults, and Christian organizations staying on the mountain.  The mountain was also one of the most sacred sites for pre-colonial Tagalog people before the arrival of the Spanish. Numerous pilgrims visit the mountain especially during Holy Week.

History

Precolonial period 
Archaeological excavations in the province attest to its rich precolonial past. Archaeological materials including burial jars, human bones, shell midden and pot shreds have been discovered at different sites in Bondoc Peninsula including the towns of San Narciso, San Andres, Mulanay and Catanauan. The most recent excavations were conducted in Catanauan by the Catanauan Archeological and Heritage Project.

According to the preliminary report released by the Catanauan Archaeological and Heritage Project, several excavations were conducted in the 1930s. One of the excavations was conducted in San Narciso where archaeologists found burial jars. The site, inspected by Ricardo Galang, resulted in the discovery of burial jars near the coast. Galang also went to San Andres where excavations yielded 14th and 15th century ceramics as well as shell bracelets and beads. According to the journal as well, at a site named Tala, archaeologists discovered a glazed Chinese jar containing bone fragments from the early Ming dynasty. Looking at other archaeological sites located in adjacent areas like Marinduque and Masbate, it can be inferred that these excavations date back to the metal period of the archipelago.

In 2012, at Mt. Kamhantik in the town of Mulanay, 15 limestone coffins were discovered. Carbon dating on a human tooth found it to be at least 1,000 years old. According to the archaeologists, the village is proof that the ancient inhabitants of the area practiced a more sophisticated way of life. Metal tools are believed to have been used to carve the coffins, and this is the first of its kind discovered in the archipelago. The remains are said to date back to the 10th to 14th century.

Spanish colonial period 

Originally, what now forms Quezon was divided among the provinces of Batangas, Laguna, and Nueva Ecija. However, at different points in time, the boundaries of Quezon changed and included parts of Aurora, Marinduque, and Camarines Norte. At the early period of Spanish colonization, the province of Aurora was called El Principe, Infanta was called Binangonan de Lampon and southern Quezon was called Kalilayan. The first European to explore the area was Juan de Salcedo in 1571–1572, during his expedition from Laguna to Camarines provinces.

In 1574, Father Diego de Oropesa founded the town of Bumaka, now known as the municipality of Gumaca.

In 1591, the province was created and was called Kaliraya or Kalilayan, after the capital town which later became Unisan.

In 1595, the Diocese of Cáceres was established by Pope Clement VIII as a suffragan of Manila. The diocese covered the entire Bicolandia region plus the towns in Kalilayan, and the Contracosta towns. At that time, the towns on the eastern seaboard were pertained to as the Contracosta and included towns from Mauban, Binangonan de Lampon, to El Principe.

The destruction of Kalilayan in 1604 by a big fleet of Moro pirates caused the inhabitants to transfer to Palsabangon (Pagbilao). Depredation and plunder by the Moros from Jolo and Brunei were rampant during the 1600s. Slavery is one reason for the proliferation of these raids. A padron for Calilaya was ordered after Tayabas suffered severely from Moro raids. It is said that 187 people were either captured or killed while 400 people fled. Fear from these raids are the primary reason as to the permanent movement of settlements along the coast further inland as well as a general decline in population. Frequent invasions by the moros disrupted the food production in the province, affecting the nutrition of its inhabitants. Maternal malnutrition was even cited as one of the primary causes of infant mortality at that time. By 1701, the previously densely settled coastal areas of the province, was described as consisting of rancherias whose inhabitants depended on wild products.

In 1705, the Military Comandancia of Nueva Ecija was created and was governed by Governor General Fausto Cruzat y Góngora. It included huge swathes of Central Luzon, the Contracosta towns as well as the Kalilayan area.

In 1749, the capital was transferred to the town of Tayabas, from which the province got its new name.

In a report by a Spanish priest named Fr. Bartolome Galan in 1823, he describes the economy of the province. According to his report, Tayabas had poor soil and the terrain is hilly which meant that conditions were not that suitable for agriculture compared to other places. The people grew upland rice, wheat, beans and vegetables. Surplus rice was sold in San Pablo and Majayjay on Mondays, the market day of those towns. Cattle breeding was rampant in towns like Tayabas, Pagbilao, Tiaong, and Sariaya. Also, unlike other provinces, haciendas were not so many in Tayabas. Instead, residents owned most of their own land.

The people of Tayabas, as in other areas, are actively trading with Manila. Santa Cruz, Laguna, was the entrepot for all goods going to the capital. The people from Lucban made products of buri and pandan leaves like hats, sleeping mata and the like which they traded. They, along with the people of Mauban also went to Polillo, at that time part of Nueva Ecija, to buy sea slugs, shells and beeswax. Being a rich agricultural area, the town of Tayabas traded rice, coconuts, and panocha with nearby towns of Majayjay, Lucban, Sariaya, Pagbilao, Mauban, Gumaca, and Atimonan. In turn, they traded fish from Pagbilao, rice from Sariaya, and high quality abaca products from Mauban and Atimonan. Lucban, as well as Tayabas, benefitted greatly from the high commercial activity of Chinese and Chinese mestizos in the pueblos.

Gumaca, being a town with little arable land depended heavily on the sea. They collected sea slugs, and tortoise shell from Alabat and traded with the mountain people there for beeswax in exchange for clothing. They even sometimes ventured to Burias Island in the Ragay Gulf in search for these goods. These products were then sent to Tayabas for shipment to Manila. Gumaca also traded items from nearby pueblos like vinegar and clothing for gold and abaca from Naga in the Bicol region.

In 1853, the new military district of Tayabas was carved from Nueva Ecija and included present-day Southern Quezon as well as present-day Aurora. In 1858, Binangonan de Lampon and the Polilio Islands were separated from Nueva Ecija to form part of Infanta. According to the Catholic Bishops' Conference of the Philippines, the two Franciscan friars named Fray Juan de Plasencia and Fray Diego de Oropesa were the ones responsible for bringing Christianity to the area. The Franciscans are also credited for spreading Christianity to towns and parishes across the province including Mauban, Sariaya and Gumaca.

Between 1855 and 1885, El Principe was established as its own Military Comandancia with its capital in Baler.

Tayabas Uprising 
It was also around this time that the Confradia de San Jose was active in the province, caused by the growing inequality between the poor and the upper classes. This organization was directed mostly on the poor and neither admitted Spaniards nor mestizos.

After years under the Spanish regime, the colonized people grew discontented with the Spaniards over the centuries. The most important event in the history of the province was the Confradia Revolt in 1841, which was led by the famous Lucbanin, Apolinario de la Cruz, popularly known as Hermano Pule. 

Years after the Cofradia Revolt, on January 20, 1843, the Tayabas Regiment, led by Sergeant Irineo Samaniego, rose in revolt against Spain, conquering Fort Santiago and other areas of Intramuros. This is the only native force in Philippine history to successfully capture Fort Santiago and Manila. For the first time, the word "Independence" was shouted by the Tayabas Regiment, encouraging their countrymen to revolt against Spain.The next day, however, the gates of Fort Santiago were opened by loyalist soldiers.  After a bloody battle, the mutineers were defeated by loyalist troops, resulting in the execution of Samaniego and 81 of his followers the same day.

The province, under General Miguel Malvar, was also among the earliest to join the Philippine Revolution. The Revolutionary Government took control over the province on August 15, 1898.

American colonial period and World War II 

The Americans then came and annexed the Philippines. A civil government was established in the province on March 12, 1901, and Lucena was made the provincial capital.

During the pacification of the archipelago by the Americans, insurrections were a commonplace in what was then Tayabas. Insurgents from neighboring provinces of Laguna and Batangas often use Tayabas as their base of operations as well as their source of supplies. An insurgent government, with connections to Gen. Malvar and Pedro Caballes was even said to be based in Infanta. This has led the American in charge, Brigadier-General J.F. Bell to decide to return to Tayabas with a larger contingent. Bell acknowledged the importance of the ports of Tayabas as sources of supplies to the insurrection such that he believed that closing all the ports in the province might convince the leaders of the resistance to surrender.

In 1902, the district of El Principe was transferred from the jurisdiction of Nueva Ecija to Tayabas. In the same year, Marinduque became part of Tayabas province by virtue of Act 499 enacted by the Philippine Commission. However, by 1920, Act 2280 was passed by the Philippine Congress, reestablishing Marinduque as a separate province. The present areas of north Aurora were transferred from the authority of Nueva Vizcaya to Tayabas in 1905.

Because of the distance between Tayabas and Bicol and the growing population, Tayabas came under the jurisdiction of the Diocese of Lipa in 1910.

Japanese occupation of the province during World War II began on December 23, 1941, when the Japanese Imperial Army landed in Atimonan. The General Headquarters of the Philippine Commonwealth Army and Philippine Constabulary was stationed in Tayabas from January 3, 1942, to June 30, 1946, are military operates against the Japanese Occupation. The occupation witnessed the brutal murders of prominent sons of Tayabas. April 4, 1945 was the day the province was liberated as the combined Filipino and American army forces reached Lucena.

Post-war period

Name change from Tayabas to Quezon 
After the war, on September 7, 1946, Republic Act No. 14 changed the name Tayabas to Quezon, in honor of Manuel L. Quezon, the Commonwealth president who hailed from Baler, which was one of the province's towns.

Rise of the coconut industry 
Even before the Philippines gained its independence, the province has already depended heavily on coconuts. This history can clearly be seen through the opulent houses built in the town of Sariaya during this period. Coconuts served as the main source of income for the landed class of Sariaya and this allowed them to build the ancestral houses that we see today. This has led some companies like Peter Paul to establish its presence in Candelaria to manufacture products like desiccated coconut. as early as this period.

Establishment of the Province of Aurora 
In June 1951, the northern part of Quezon (specifically, the towns of Baler, Casiguran, Dilasag, Dingalan, Dinalongan, Dipaculao, Maria Aurora and San Luis) was made into the sub-province of Aurora. Aurora was the name of the president's wife, Aurora Quezon. Aurora was finally separated from Quezon as an independent province in 1979. Upon the issuance of Executive Order No. 103, dated May 17, 2002, by then-President Gloria Macapagal-Arroyo, the province of Aurora was moved to Central Luzon (Region III), geographical location of the province; the remaining areas of Quezon & other provinces of Southern Tagalog divided into Calabarzon and Mimaropa, and Southern Tagalog was limited to being a cultural-geographic region.

During the Marcos dictatorship 
 
Quezon Province was not spared the social and economic turmoil during the Dictatorship of Ferdinand Marcos, including his 1971 suspension of the writ of habeas corpus, his 1972 declaration of martial law, and his continued hold on power from the lifting of martial law in 1981 until his ouster under the People Power Revolution of 1986. One major event that took place during this period was the Guinayangan massacre of February 1, 1981, in which Military elements opened fire on a group of about coconut farmers who were marching towards the Guinayangan plaza air to protest  the coco levy fund scam. Two people were killed and 27 were wounded.

Among the Quezon citizens who were victims of forced disappearances during the Marcos dictatorship were human rights worker Albert Enriquez of Lucena, who documented military abuses as a volunteer for Task Force Detainees of the Philippines; and activist Ramon Jasul who founded the Bagong Kabataan ng Lukban (New Youth of Lucban) in his hometown. Enriquez was abducted by armed men on Aug. 29, 1985, while Jasul was abducted in Makati as part of the Southern Tagalog 10 incident of late July 1977. Neither were ever seen again, and both were eventually honored by having their names engraved on the wall of remembrance at the Philippines' Bantayog ng mga Bayani.

Contemporary period

Quezon–Camarines Norte boundary dispute 
In 1989, the province of Quezon, represented by Governor Hjalmar Quintana, was involved in a boundary dispute with the province of Camarines Norte, represented by Roy Padilla, over 9 barangays of over 8,000 hectares at their border. These barangays are Kagtalaba, Plaridel, Kabuluan, Don Tomas, Guitol, Tabugon, Maualawin, Patag Ibaba and Patag Iraya. The boundary dispute originated from Act 2711 or the Revised Administrative Code which was enacted in 1917. Section 42 of Act 2711 defines the Tayabas-Camarines Norte boundary as:

Camarines Norte and Tayabas boundary. – The boundary separating the Province of Camarines Norte from the Province of Tayabas begins at a point on the eastern shore of Basiad Bay and extends to a peak known as Mount Cadig in such manner as to bring the territory of the barrio of Basiad entirely within the municipality of Capalonga, in Camarines Norte, and to exclude the same from the territory of Calauag, in Tayabas. From Mount Cadig it extends along the crest of a mountain range, a distance of 50 kilometers, more or less, to a peak known as Mount Labo; thence in a southwesterly direction, a distance of 25 kilometers, more or less, to a prominent stone monument at the source or headwaters of the Pasay River, thence along the meandering course of said river in a southerly direction, a distance of 1½ kilometers, more or less, to the Gulf of Ragay.

In 1922, the then Chief of the Executive Bureau, acted upon the authority of the Secretary of the Interior. This ruling by the then chief was never implemented even with repeated efforts of the provincial government of Camarines Norte and the Secretary of Interior. The Chief delineated the border as follows:

Starting from the peak of Mt. Labo as a common corner between the provinces of Tayabas, Camarines Sur and Camarines Norte thence a straight line is drawn to the peak of Mt. Cadig; thence a straight line is drawn to the point of intersection of the inter-provincial road between Camarines Norte and Tayabas with the Tabugon River; thence, following the course of the river to its mouth at Basiad Bay.

In the legal dispute, Quezon raised two points of contention. First is that Act 2711 already delineated the boundaries of the province. Second is that the Chief of the Executive Bureau had no power nor authority to change the boundaries of the province. Regarding the first issue, the court stated that it is true that Act 2711 delineated the boundary but it did not delineate the entirety of the boundary. The point on the eastern shore of Basiad Bay was never specifically located, thus, needing further delineation. On the second issue, the court stated that the Chief did not alter the borders in any way. The Chief worked with the requirement that the point be on the eastern shore of Basiad Bay. He was also acting on the consideration of Act 2809, the Act establishing Camarines Norte, which states that Camarines Norte be established with the borders it had before merging with Camarines Sur. The court then ruled in favor of Camarines Norte and ordered the provincial government of Quezon to transfer all its authority and jurisdiction to the former.

By 2001, the Provincial Government of Quezon, this time represented by Governor Eduardo Rodriguez, the Provincial Government of Camarines Norte, as represented by Governor Roy Padilla, went back to court. Even with the judgment on the 1989 case was executory by 1990, the provincial government of Quezon did not abide by the court's ruling. In 1991, a DENR technical team conducted a survey of the area and erected a monument marker to delineate the boundary of the area. However, by October 1991, Quezon Governor Eduardo Rodriguez and Calauag Mayor Julio Lim caused the removal of the marker. Throughout the proceedings, several government agencies including the Department of Budget and Management, Comelec, as well as the Philippine Statistics Authority recognized the jurisdiction of the town of Santa Elena, Camarines Norte over the 9 barangays. In 2000, Judge Regino held Governor Rodriguez and Mayor Lim guilty of contempt, with a maximum imprisonment of 6 months as well as a fine of 1,000 pesos for the erection of a new boundary marker.

Failed proposal to divide Quezon 

In 2007, Republic Act No. 9495 proposed to further divide Quezon into Quezon del Norte and Quezon del Sur. Quezon del Norte was to be composed of the first and second congressional districts of the province (Burdeos, General Nakar, Infanta, Jomalig, Lucban, Mauban, Pagbilao, Panukulan, Patnanungan, Polilio, Real, Sampaloc, Tayabas, Candelaria, Dolores, San Antonio, Sariaya, Tiaong and Lucena), with Lucena as its capital. Quezon del Sur, with its capital at Gumaca, would have been composed of the third and fourth congressional districts (Agdangan, Buenavista, Catanauan, General Luna, Macalelon, Mulanay, Padre Burgos, Pitogo, San Andres, San Francisco, San Narciso, Unisan, Alabat, Atimonan, Calauag, Guinayangan, Gumaca, Lopez, Perez, Plaridel, Quezon and Tagkawayan). The act lapsed into law without the signature of President Gloria Macapagal Arroyo on September 7, 2007.

As required by law, the COMELEC held a plebiscite on December 13, 2008, 60 days after law took effect. The majority of the votes cast overwhelmingly rejected the division, therefore the split did not push through.

Geography

Physical characteristics 
It is the largest province of Calabarzon, comprising 879,660 hectares or 53.21% of the total land area of the region. Of this area, 513,618 hectares is categorized as agricultural land. The northern part of the province is sandwiched between the Sierra Madre mountain range and the Philippine Sea. The southern part consists of the Tayabas Isthmus, which separates the Bicol Peninsula from the main part of Luzon Island, and the Bondoc Peninsula which lies between Tayabas Bay and Ragay Gulf. Because of this, majority of towns in the province have access to the sea. The province is bounded by the provinces of Aurora, Bulacan, Rizal, Laguna, Batangas, Camarines Sur and Camarines Norte. It is bounded to the east by the Pacific Ocean and to the south by Tayabas Bay. The province is said to be characterized by a rugged terrain with patches of plains, valleys and swamps.

The major islands of Quezon are Alabat Island and Polillo Islands. It supplies geothermal power to the Mak-Ban Geothermal Power Plant.

The province has a total of 1,066.36 km of coastline and has several bays including Burdeos Bay, Lamon Bay, Calauag Bay, Lopez Bay, Ragay Gulf, Pagbilao Bay and Tayabas Bay. The Infanta Watershed has extensive and highly productive aquifers while Mauban and Atimonan have no significant groundwater. According to the DENR, in 2003, Quezon had 231,190 hectares of forest cover. However, due to rampant illegal logging as well as kaingin, these forests are constantly threatened.

Climate 
Because of the sheer size of Quezon, different areas have different climate patterns. Most of the province falls under Type IV Climate which means that rains are evenly distributed throughout the year. Polillo, Infanta, and parts of Calauag fall under Type II climate which means that there are no dry seasons but there is a pronounced wet season from November to April. Parts of the western towns of Tiaong, San Antonio, Dolores, and Candelaria as well as the tip of Bondoc Peninsula including parts of Mulanay, San Francisco, San Narciso and San Andres fall under Type III climate. This means that there is a relatively dry season from November to April. Although these are the patterns observed, it is important to note that with climate change, these patterns have become more erratic. Typhoons have become stronger through the years, causing problems such as power outages, road blockages, landslides, flashfloods and crop damages.

Administrative divisions 
Quezon comprises 39 municipalities and one component city (Tayabas), which are organized into four legislative districts and further subdivided into 1,209 barangays.

The capital, Lucena, is independent of the administrative and fiscal supervision of the province but is eligible to vote for provincial officials.

In the 1800s when Jean Mallat de Bassilan conducted a survey of the province, it only had 17 towns.

In 1902, during the American period, Tayabas was divided as follows:

Demographics 

When the Census of the Philippine Islands was conducted in 1902 during the American era, Tayabas, excluding the subprovince of Marinduque, had a total population of 153,065. 2,803 were considered as wild, or part of the non-Christian tribes like the Aetas while 150,262 people were considered as civilized. Of the civilized population, 75,774 were males while 74,488 were female. 287 were of mixed descent while the rest are categorized as "Brown".

Based on 2010 census of the household population in Quezon, 90.0 percent reported Tagalog as their ethnicity. The other 10.0 percent were reported as belonging to these ethnic groups: Bisaya/Binisaya (4.2 percent), Bikol/Bicol (3.6 percent), Cebuano (0.6 percent), Ilocano (0.2 percent), and others. 

The inhabitants are mostly Tagalogs. The population is concentrated in the flat south-central portion which includes Lucena City, Sariaya, and Candelaria. After World War II, Infanta and surrounding towns received migrants from Manila, Laguna, Rizal and Batangas. People from Marinduque moved to the southern part of the Tayabas Isthmus and the Bondoc Peninsula. Ilocanos from Ilocos Region, Cagayan Valley, Central Luzon and Cordillera Administrative Region migrated to the northernmost towns of General Nakar, Infanta and Real, and even to Tagkawayan. Bicolanos from Bicol Region migrated to the easternmost towns of Calauag and Tagkawayan.

Filipino Chinese also have a long history in Tayabas (modern Quezon, Aurora and Marinduque provinces). In 1939, the province ranked 5th among all provinces including Manila in terms of the concentration of Filipino Chinese. This ethnic group has a long history of being active in business and commerce as shown by the business chambers existent before. However, as the Chinese intermarried with locals, these groups have dwindled in number.

The province used to be home to various Aeta tribes. Other terms used to call them include "Umag", "Ata", "Atid", and "Itim". The Aeta used to clear coconut plantations and other odd jobs in exchange for food or clothing. These people, though seem as uncivilized by some, have a very rich culture. Some forms of their art include body scarification. The Aeta cause wound on their skin in various parts of their body including back, arms, legs, hands, calves and abdomen. They then irritate them during healing using fire, lime and other materials to form scars. They also bore holes on their septum and then proceed to decorate it with a sliver of bamboo. The Aeta also have various musical instruments like the nose flute and the gurimbaw, a stringed instrument made of coconuts, fibers from lukmong vines and bamboo.

Languages 
There are five indigenous languages in Quezon province. There are the dominant Tagalog language, the Manide language in the east and a small portion in the north, the Agta Dumagat Umiray language in the north and a small area in the center, the already-extinct Katabaga language which used to be in the south, and the endangered Alabat Agta in Alabat island. 

The province primarily speaks a Tagalog dialect called Tayabas Tagalog or Tayabasin.  Tayabas Tagalog has the cultural dynamics of linangin and bayanin. With that, deeper Tagalog is also classified as amot or linangin, which, in the Tayabas context, is related to something remote or far from the bayan or town center. Most of the Tayabas dialectal terms are not found in the Filipino dictionary, or if they are, they have a different meaning. The Tagalog of different towns in the province also has variants of dialectal terms that may be peculiar to other towns in the province. Similar to standardized Tagalog, Tayabasin has influences from Spanish,  Chinese, English, the Bicol Region, Marinduque, Laguna, Batangas, and even the Ilocos and Visayas. The Tayabasin dialect of the local Quezonins is also known for distinctive expressions like hane, kawasa, and yano.

In 2010, UNESCO released its 3rd world volume of Endangered Languages in the World, where 3 critically endangered languages were in the Philippines. One of these languages is the Alabat Island Agta language. The language was classified as Critically Endangered, meaning the youngest speakers are grandparents and older, and they speak the language partially and infrequently and hardly pass the language to their children and grandchildren anymore.

Religion 
Majority of Quezon's inhabitants practice Roman Catholicism and other Christian denominations like Iglesia Filipina Independiente. Most non-Christians practice Islam, indigenous Philippine folk religions, animism, or atheism.

Government

The Quezon Provincial Board or the Sangguniang Panlalawigan is the provincial legislature.

Incumbent officials
 Governor: Angelina Tan
 Vice Governor: Anacleto A. Alcala III

Economy 

Farming and fishing are the main sources of livelihood in the province. Commercial, industrial, and banking activities are mostly concentrated in the south-central part of the province.

Agro-industry 
Quezon province is called “Cocolandia”, with the  Philippine Statistics Authority (PSA) confirming the province is the top coconut producer in Calabarzon—composed of Cavite, Laguna, Batangas, Rizal and Quezon—and in the whole country. This stems from the fact that agricultural activities drive its economy. People mainly engage in farming and fishing operations.

Quezon has a total agricultural area of 403,935 hectares representing 51 percent of the total provincial land area. Of this, 375,026 hectares are planted with coconut in 2018, making Quezon the province with the largest coconut production area in the Philippines. Also, Quezon is the top coconut producing province in terms of total coconut production in the country with 1,449,926.81 metric tons.

Quezon is the country's leading producer of coconut products such as desiccated coconut, virgin coconut oil, coconut juice, coconut oil and copra. A large part of the province is covered in coconut plantations. Several large companies geared toward processing coconuts have factories in the province. This includes companies in Candelaria including Peter Paul Philippine Corporation, Primex Coco Products Inc., Pacific Royal Basic Foods, SuperStar Corporation, and Tongsan Industrial Development Corporation which are focused on processing desiccated coconut and other specialty coconut products. Other companies in Lucena like Tantuco Enterprises, and JNJ Oil Industries on the other hand are focused on producing coconut oil and other coconut oil based products like margarine, and lard. Because of the coconut industry, copra traders from provinces like Marinduque, Romblon, and Masbate regularly visit the province.

However, the coconut industry is faced with several threats from cocolisap to the coconut lumber trade. When cocolisap posed a huge threat to the coconut industry, the government had to act swiftly with countermeasures aimed at fighting the coconut scaling insect.

Aside from coconuts, Quezon is also the most important agricultural province among the provinces in Calabarzon in terms of producing staple food items such as rice and corn. The province supplies 200,000 MT of rice and corn annually or around 42% of the total rice and corn requirement of the region. Other major crops are rice, corn, banana, and coffee.

Fishing 
Because of its long coastline and the presence of numerous marshes and bays, fishing is also a large part of the province's economy. Quezon accounts for 33% or around 132,239 MT of fish produced in the region. Several fish port complexes exist in the province, including ports in Atimonan, Lucena, Infanta, and Guinayangan. These ports serve as hubs for the trade of fish and other aquatic resources like round scad, anchovies, tuna, and groupers. The province has three fishing districts. The first is found in the northeast encompassing Lamon Bay. The southeast portion includes the Ragay Gulf while the south central portion covers Tayabas Bay. Aside from fishing, aquaculture is also important in the coastal municipalities of the province. Bangus and prawns are among the most cultured species.

Forestry 
Due to its proximity to the southern fringes of the Sierra Mountain range. Northern Quezon has been a hotspot for illegal logging. Frequent raids in towns like Mauban often yield hardwood timber like Narra and Kamagong.

Commerce and banking 
The capital city of Lucena is considered to be the economic center of the province. There are currently three malls in the province. Two of them are located in Lucena namely SM City Lucena and Pacific Mall Lucena. Citymall, located in Tiaong, is the third mall in the province. Major banks like BDO, Metrobank, Land Bank, BPI, PNB, RCBC, UnionBank, among other Manila-based banks are present in the western part of the province. BDO however made a move to establish a regional head office at Lucena due to the growing demand and economic importance of the province itself. On the other hand, namely QCRB, Rural Bank of Atimonan and Card Bank rural banks serve most if not all municipalities of the province.

Several rural banks were also established in Quezon namely Rural Bank of Dolores, United Rural Bank of Lopez, Rural Bank of Lucban, Rural Bank of General Luna, and Rural Bank of Sampaloc.

Infrastructure

Transportation

Roads 

Pan-Philippine Highway (N1/AH26), which comprises most of Manila South Road, and Quirino Highway (N68), the Quezon leg of Andaya Highway form the highway backbone network, and the secondary and tertiary roads interconnect most cities and municipalities, except for Infanta, Real, and General Nakar, whose highways used to access those municipalities interconnect with the national highway network in Laguna and Rizal or Manila East Road and Marcos Highway. The provincial government maintains provincial roads which supplements the national roads.

In order to spur development in the province, several proposals have been made to expand the expressway network to Quezon. The South Luzon Expressway, which terminates at Santo Tomas, Batangas, will be extended to Barangay Mayao, Lucena with the construction of Toll Road 4 (SLEX TR-4) Three expressways being proposed for construction includes the Manila – Quezon Expressway (MQX), which will pass through Rizal and eastern Laguna, Quezon-Bicol Expressway (QuBEx), which will link between Lucena and San Fernando, Camarines Sur. and Toll Road 5 (SLEX TR-5) extending SLEX to Matnog, Sorsogon.

Public Transportations 
Quezon Province's public transportation mainly include jeepneys and tricycles. Transportation between town usually serve by jeepney, UV express and buses.
Buses serves as the main mode of transportation to and from Metro Manila as well as nearby provinces. Bus companies like JAC Liner, JAM Liner, DLTBCo, N. Dela Rosa Liner, AB Liner, P&O liner, Supreme, AH, and Superlines has a terminal in the province.

Railroads 
The South Line of Philippine National Railway's north–south railway passes through the different towns of Quezon from Tutuban to Bicol. This includes stops in Lucena, Pagbilao (Malicboy), Agdangan, Plaridel, Gumaca, Lopez (Hondagua), Calauag (Aloneros), and Tagkawayan. However, no trains are operating along this line as of present.

Seaports 
The Dalahican Port and Cotta Port in Lucena provide direct access to the neighboring island provinces of Marinduque, and Romblon. The Port of Real provides access to the islands of Polillo while the Atimonan and Gumaca ports provide access to the island of Alabat. The port in San Andres provides access to Masbate and Burias islands.

Airports 
There are several airports that exist in Quezon. This includes the Lucena Airport, Pagbilao Grande Airport, Alabat Airport (Alabat Island) Jomalig Airport (Jomalig Island), and the Balesin (Tordesillas) Airport (Balesin Island). Only Balesin Airport is being used as of present for Manila-Balesin flights.

Energy 

Quezon is home to several power plants that supply energy to the Luzon grid. The Pagbilao Power Station is the first power plant in the province. Located at Isla Grande in Pagbilao, the 735 MW coal fueled power plant started operations as early as 1993. This power plant is currently being managed by Team Energy Corp. and is undergoing a 420 MW expansion. The Mauban Power Station is also a coal fueled power plant located in Barangay Cagsiay I. Managed by Quezon Power, the 420 MW power plant started operations in the year 2000. The third power plant, a 600 MW coal fueled plant, is currently in the planning stage and is going to be located in Barangay Villa Ibaba in the town of Atimonan. Together, these three provide jobs to the people as Quezon as well as addressing the energy needs of the province and the greater Luzon area.

There are three power distributors in the province, namely Meralco, Quezon I Electric Cooperative (QUEZELCO-I), and Quezon II Electric Cooperative (QUEZELCO-II). Meralco provides electricity to the province's second district as well as the adjacent towns of Pagbilao, Lucban, Sampaloc, Mauban and Tayabas City. QUEZELCO-I distributes power to the towns of the province's 3rd and 4th districts, as well as Santa Elena, Camarines Norte, and Del Gallego, Camarines Sur. QUEZELCO-II distributes power to the towns of the province's first district, except for the towns served by Meralco.

Water security 
The Quezon Metropolitan Water District (QMWD), formerly known as the Lucena Pagbilao Tayabas Water District or LUPATA, serves the Metro Lucena area including Lucena City, Tayabas City, and Pagbilao. In 2020, Prime Water took over the administration and operation of QMWD. It draws its water largely from the May-it Spring although this source has prove inadequate to supply the area. Other towns are served by their own water districts. Some areas like the Infanta area are characterized by highly productive aquifers but other areas like Mauban and Atimonan have no significant water productivity.

Due to the pressures of a growing population, Quezon is one of the provinces from which the government plans to source part of the demand for water of Metro Manila. In General Nakar, construction is ongoing as of 2016 on a tunnel to divert water from the Sumag River to Angat Dam. The tunnel will link up with the Umiray-Angat Transbasin Project to provide water to Angat Dam. Aside from this, there are plans for the construction of the New Centennial Water Source Project – Kaliwa Lower Dam and the Kanan Dam in Northern Quezon for power generation and water supply of Metro Manila. The Sangguniang Panlalawigan of Quezon is against the construction of this project stating that it will not allow water from the Agos River, both on the left (kaliwa) and on the right (kanan) sides of the river. Locals fear that the construction of the project would cause massive destruction of forests, crops, animals and property in the Metro REINA (Real-Infanta-General Nakar) area. After Typhoon Vamco (Ulysses) severely hit the province (especially the northern part of Quezon) in late 2020, which made its landfall there three times and produced flooding in Daraitan in Tanay (Rizal province), General Nakar and Infanta, groups reiterated the call for opposition of Kaliwa Dam and instead pushed for the protection of the Sierra Madre Mountains.

Tourism and culture 

Tourism is still a minor but growing part of the province's economy. Several attractions draw tourists from the Philippines and abroad including festivals, beaches, old structures, and other sights.

Quezon Province has a huge potential for optimum utilization of and considerable revenue generation from the tourism sector. There are approximately 709 tourist destinations. 321 of which are natural, 32 man-made, 74 historical, 78 cultural/festival/ fiesta, 1 agri-tourism, 203 resort/hotel/restaurant and 14 religious attractions. Majority of the tourism-related activities are handled by the municipal LGUs in collaboration with the private sector.

In 2018, total tourist arrivals into the province were recorded at 1,101,846. Same-day visitors reached 10,989,183 mostly by domestic tourists.

Festivals 

Among the festivals of Quezon, the three most prominent and famous are the Pahiyas Festival of Lucban, the Niyugyugan Festival of Quezon Province and Katang Festival of Calauag.

The Pahiyas Festival is the thanksgiving celebration of the people in Lucban for the Feast of St. Isidore Labrador, the patron saint of farmers. Held every May 15, during the Pahiyas Festival people of Lucban decorates their houses in the most creative manner. They uses their harvest vegetables and grains like rice, chayotes, radishes, tomato, sweet potato, squash and the colorful kiping. Kiping is an ornament made of grounded rice flour shaped into leaves and dyed in different colors. These materials are used to make the houses colorful during the event which Pahiyas is famous for.

The Niyugyugan Festival is a relatively new festival that started in 2012 celebrating the province's main product, the coconut. The festival celebrates the diversity of every town in the province through an expo. During this expo, the different towns build their own booths showcasing the best qualities of their town and then presents the products that their respective towns produce. During this event, towns also join the Float Parade and Street Dancing Competition.

According to journalist and multi-awarded international boxing judge Rey Danseco, Calauag, one of the rich coastal municipalities of the province, celebrates Katang Festival (Crab Festival). The annual colorful and exciting festivities take place several days until May 25, the town's founding anniversary. Tourists from neighboring towns, provinces, and other countries join the fun and witness Calaugeneans’ unique fiesta celebration and presentations of indigenous products, delicacies, and different ways of cooking Katang. The Karera ng Katang (Crab Race) and Pabilisan at Paramihan ng Maitataling Katang (Crab Tying Race) are some of the highlights of the festivities. 
The Philippines’ Department of Tourism promotes the Katang Festival as "A festival highlighting the Higanteng Alimango as their icon. The feast celebrates the abundance of mud crab in the province.“
Katang Festival has foremost aims of promoting Agro-Tourism and solidifying Calauag's distinction as source of best variety and most delicious crab and other marine products such as shrimp (hipon or swahe) and giant Asian tiger prawn  (sugpo) in the Philippines.

Other colorful festivals are Mayohan sa Tayabas (Tayabas City), Agawan Festival (Sariaya), Araña't Baluarte (Gumaca), Pasayahan sa Lucena(Lucena City), Candle Festival (Candelaria), Boling Boling Festival (Catanauan), Maubanog Festival (Mauban), Kaway Festival (Tagkawayan), Laguimanoc Festival (Padre Burgos), Tariktik Festival (Polillo), Centurion Festival (Mulanay, San Narciso, General Luna), Buhusan Festival (Lucban), Kubol ng Macalelon (Macalelon), Hambujan Festival (Dolores), Pamaypayan Festival (Lopez), Coconut Festival (Alabat), Kayakas Festival (Perez), Mais Festival (Tiaong), Gayang Festival (Guinayangan), Tagultol Fishing Festival (Atimonan), Palay Iskad Festival (Buenavista), Maisan Festival (San Andres) and Papag at Bilao Festival (Pagbilao)

Beaches and springs 

To the north, the island of Balesin (part of Polillo) has become playground to the rich and famous. The exclusive island resort features seven resorts, providing its members the luxury of choosing to stay in differently themed villas. Although quite far, Salibungot beach of Jomalig is known to backpackers for its golden shores. Real on the other hand is becoming known for surfing. Pulong Pasig in Calauag and Cagbalete Island of Mauban are known for white beaches.

In the south central portion of the province, the beaches of Guisguis in Sariaya have long been considered a local destination. Several resorts including Villa del Prado Resort, Dalampasigan Beach Resort and the Montevista Beach Resort are some of the resorts in the area.

The Mainit Hot Spring in Tayabas is popular among locals.

Baroque churches, heritage houses, and other attractions 

Quezon is home to heritage houses from the early 20th century built in the American architecture of the time such as the Enriquez-Gala Mansion, Gala-Rodriguez House and Villa Sariaya. Not only do these houses tell stories of the opulence afforded by coconut landlords but also gives us a glimpse of the uncertainty during wartime. Some of these stunning buildings are considered endangered due to road widening plans within the poblacion that will destroy these cultural icons forever.

The country life of the Philippines is what the Villa Escudero in Tiaong offers to its guests. Featuring its waterfall restaurant, the plantation resort actually has deep historical roots tracing its origins back to the coconut growing industry of Quezon. Other Spanish-era structures also exist outside Sariaya such as the Casa de Comunidad de Tayabas, Malagonlong bridge.

Minor Basilica de San Miguel in Tayabas and St. Louis Bishop Parish in Lucban are other testament of Spanish History in the province.

Aside from the old churches, Kamay ni Hesus Healing Grotto which is very popular for the pilgrims, is located at Lucban.

Other attractions that tourist may visit Perez Park, Quezon Natural Park (Zigzag Road, Atimonan), and Tayabas Capitol.

Quezon also has large venue for concert and sporting events. Quezon Convention Center and Alcala Sports Complex.

Mountains 
Mount Banahaw is a pilgrimage site for some locals who believe the mountain to be holy. Although considered an active volcano, hiking has been popular with both religious pilgrims as well as hikers. There are two trails to the mountain, both originating from Barangay Kinabuhayan in the town of Dolores. The most frequently used trails are the Cristalino and Tatlong Tangke, taking an average of 9 and 5 hours, respectively but both converges at the volcano's summit. At the peak are viewpoints, labeled as Durungawan I, II, and III, which are the usual destination for pilgrims and hikers. However, due to pollution and trash left by these visitors, Mt. Banahaw was closed to the public until further notice.

Food 
As one of the consistent top producers of coconut, Quezon Province is also dubbed as the "Coconut Capital of the Philippines". With the abundance of coconuts in the area, Quezon became famous for its native liqueurs such as lambanog and tubâ. Quezon's food is richly influenced by the native ingredients found in the area like coconut and other agricultural crops. As such, gata or coconut milk can be found in different dishes like ginataang suso (snail), kulawo, sinugno, sinantulan and pinais. Since Quezon has long coastline, food with seafood as main ingredient is common in the province.
As the province is relatively near Bicol, Laguna and Batangas, some Batangas, Laguna and Bicol dishes like lomi, buko pie, and laing are relatively common in the area.

Some of the unique dishes from Quezon include Pansit Habhab, Lucban longganisa, Pansit Chami, Hardinera, Sinantomas, Bumbay (Batsoy), Dinayukan, Alang-ang and other dishes made of native fern called pako. Quezon is also known for popular pastries and delicacies such as Budin, Puto Bao, Yema cake, Letse Puto, Minukmok, Tikoy/Kalamay, Kalabasang Pilipit, Pinagong and pitsi pitsi.

Education 

There are 1032 public school in Quezon. 818 school are primary while 214 are secondary school. These are under monitoring and supervision of Division of Quezon and Lucena.

The provinces is also the home for some educational institutions and universities. Southern Luzon State University, PUP - Lopez Campus, Dalubhasaan ng Lungsod ng Lucena and Quezon National Agriculture School are the state university and institution in Quezon. Also in the province are the private institution like Manuel S. Enverga University Foundation, AMA Computer College-Lucena, Maryhill College, Sacred Heart College, STI College Lucena, Tayabas Western Academy, St. Anne College, Calayan Education Foundation, ABE International College of Business and Economic, Holy Rosary Catholic School.

Notable people 

 Tommy Abuel,  actor – Lucban
 Vitaliano Aguirre, 58th Secretary of the Department of Justice – Mulanay
 Proceso Alcala,  43rd Secretary of the Department of Agriculture – Lucena City
 Leo Austria, former PBA player, current SMB coach in the PBA – Sariaya, Quezon
 Mac Baracael, professional Filipino basketball player – Pagbilao, Quezon
 Ana Capri, actress – Infanta
 Mel Chionglo, film director and production designer - Lucena
 Fides Cuyugan-Asensio, National Artist of the Philippines for Music - Lucena
 Rey Danseco, WBC Award winner-International Boxing Judge and sports editor – Calauag, Lopez, and Gumaca 
 Horacio de la Costa, Jesuit, historian, the first Filipino Provincial Superior of the Society of Jesus in the Philippines - Maúban
 Agnes Devanadera, former Solicitor-General and former Acting Secretary of the Department of Justice – Sampaloc
 Alice Dixson, actress – Philippine Cinema – Buenavista
 Guillermo Eleazar, PNP Chief who has previously served as chief of the Quezon City Police District, Director of the PNP Calabarzon and the National Capital Region Police Office – Tagkawayan, Quezon
 Arturo Enrile, 24th Chief of Staff of the Armed Forces of the Philippines - Lucena
 Josefina Guerrero, spy and war heroine - Lucban
 Angel Lagdameo, Archbishop of the Archdiocese of Jaro and former President of the Catholic Bishops' Conference of the Philippines – Lucban
 Rio Locsin, actress – Candelaria, Quezon
 Mark Magsumbol, first Filipino player in 31-team American Basketball Association (ABA) – Calauag
 Ahtisa Manalo, Bb. Pilipinas International 2018 – Candelaria, Quezon
 Raimund Marasigan, musician (Eraserheads, Sandwich, Pedicab, Cambio) – Candelaria
 Mau Marcelo, winner, Philippine Idol TV5 – Lucena
 Paz Márquez-Benítez, author of Dead Stars (1925), short-story writer, educator and editor - Lucena
 Emilio Z. Marquez,  former bishop of the Roman Catholic Diocese of Lucena, first Bishop of Gumaca - Lopez, Quezon
 Pauline Mendoza, actress/model – Lucban, Quezon
 Lily Monteverde, movie producer – Sariaya
 Manoling Morato, former Chairman of the Philippine Charity Sweepstakes Office – Calauag
 Tomas Morato, last municipal President and first Mayor of Calauag and Quezon City, First Representative of the 2nd District of Tayabas, Manuel L. Quezon's best friend – Calauag
 Edgar Mortiz, actor/director – Infanta
 Orlando Nadres, writer/screenwriter/director – Tayabas City
 Jose Francisco Oliveros, A bishop who served as the second Bishop of the Diocese of Boac, Marinduque and fourth Bishop of the Diocese of Malolos – Quezon, Quezon
 Leo Oracion, first Filipino mountaineer to successfully reach the Mt. Everest summit – Lucban, Quezon
 Paraluman, actress  – Tayabas City
 Marcelito Pomoy, Filipino Singer, Philippine Got Talent champion, America's Got Talent 3rd Runner-up – Calauag
 Gil M. Portes,  a Filipino film director, film producer and screenwriter – Pagbilao
 Hermano Pule, religious leader who founded and led the Cofradía de San José. – Lucban
 Raymundo Punongbayan, former director, PHIVOLCS – Calauag
 Manuel L. Quezon, the second President of the Philippines – Baler (now a part of Aurora)
 Claro M. Recto, former Senator, former Associate Justice of the Philippine Supreme Court – Tiaong
 Kris Psyche Resus, Miss Philippines Earth 2010 – Infanta
 Rene Saguisag, former senator - Maúban
 Ice Seguerra, Filipino actress and singer – Calauag 
 Lorenzo Tañada III, Congressman, Liberal Party Spokesman – Gumaca
 Wigberto Tañada, former Liberal Party President and former senator – Gumaca
 Lorenzo Tañada, former Senator – Gumaca
 Chris Tsuper, radio DJ of Love Radio – Lucban
 Romeo Vasquez, actor – Tayabas City

Explanatory notes

References

External links 

 Official website of Quezon province
 Local Governance Performance Management System 

 
1591 establishments in the Philippines
Provinces of the Philippines
Provinces of Calabarzon
States and territories established in 1591